The Musi River is a major tributary of the Krishna River in the Deccan Plateau, flowing through Telangana, India. Hyderabad stands on the banks of the Musi River, which divides the historic Old City from the new city. The Musi River flows into Himayat Sagar and Osman Sagar, which are artificial lakes that act as reservoirs that once supplied the twin cities of Hyderabad and Secunderabad with drinking water. It originates in the Ananthagiri Hills, near Vikarabad. It generally flows towards the east, turning south at Chittaloor. It flows into the Krishna River at Vadapally near Miryalaguda in Nalgonda district.

Places of interest
Telangana High Court
City college
Mahatma Gandhi Bus Station
Osmania General Hospital
Salar Jung Museum
State Central Library

Floods

The Musi river was the cause of frequent flood devastation of Hyderabad city until the early decades of the 20th century. On 28 September 1908, Hyderabad was flooded, which included 17 inches of rain in one day, killing around 15,000 people.

The modern era of the development of the twin cities began soon after these floods in 1908. This necessitated planned, phased development.

Abdallah Ahmed Bin Mahfooz submitted his report on 1 October 1909, with recommendations on preventing a recurrence of floods and improving civic amenities. However, there are conflicting reports that Sir 
M. Visvesvaraya was engaged by the erstwhile Nizam to help design the drainage system and prevent floods. Nizam VII constituted a City Improve Trust in 1912. He built a flood control system on the river. A dam was built in 1920 across the river, ten miles (16  km) upstream from the city called Osman Sagar. In 1927 another reservoir was built on Esi (a tributary of Musi) and named Himayat Sagar. These lakes prevented the flooding of the River Musi and are major drinking water sources for Hyderabad city.

Current status

Due to indiscriminate urbanization and lack of planning, the river had earlier become a receptacle of untreated domestic and industrial waste dumping out of Hyderabad. It was estimated that nearly 350 MLD  of polluted water and sewage originating from Hyderabad and Secunderabad flow into the river. Efforts to clean it have failed. The river water downstream of the cities remained highly polluted and considered to be a major disaster in Hyderabad. 

Musi is now one of the most polluted rivers in India. Recent studies have shown the presence of super bugs in the water of Musi. Researchers and some drug company employees say the presence of more than 300 drug firms, combined with lax oversight and inadequate water treatment, has left the river laced with antibiotics, making this a giant Petri dish for anti-microbial resistance. Drug makers including large Indian firms Dr Reddy's Laboratories Ltd REDY.NS, Aurobindo Pharma Ltd ARBN.NS and Hetero Drugs Ltd, and U.S. giant Mylan Inc MYL.O discharge effluents into waterways, Musi is now "critically polluted". These drug-resistant superbugs are a serious threat to people as these bacteria are resistant to almost every known antibiotic.

References and notes

External links

Making a Living Along the Musi River, India
Livelihoods and Wastewater Irrigated Agriculture along the Musi River in Hyderabad City
Hyderabads twin safaris left to dry and disappear

Geography of Hyderabad, India
Rivers of Telangana
Tributaries of the Krishna River
Rivers of India